Anandabodhi or Ananda Bodhi may refer to:
Ananda Bodhi Tree, an offshoot of the Bodhi Tree under which Gautama Buddha is said to have attained enlightenment
Namgyal Rinpoche, ordained as Anandabodhi bhikkhu in 1958